The Little Acre is an adventure game developed by Pewter Games Studios with Charles Cecil and published by Curve Digital. 
It was released on PlayStation 4, Xbox One, Nintendo Switch and Steam on December 13, 2016. It was originally planned to be released November 22, 2016.

Plot
Set in 1950's Ireland, The Little Acre tells the story of a small family. The player controls Aidan, a job-hunting engineer, and his daughter Lily. One morning Aidan goes missing and Lily decides to go and find him. During her search, she discovers an entrance-way to a mysterious world in the family's garden shed.

References 

Adventure games
2016 video games
MacOS games
PlayStation 4 games
Video games developed in the United Kingdom
Windows games
Xbox Cloud Gaming games
Xbox One games
Curve Games games
Single-player video games